Danube, a 1,459-ton  sailing ship named after the second longest river in Europe, was built in 1890 for the Nourse Line.

On 15 June 1891, Danube made a voyage to Fiji carrying 591 Indian indentured labourers. She also made a trip to Trinidad carrying  609 passengers, arriving on 1 January 1892; there were 29 deaths during this voyage.

Later in 1892, Danube disappeared during a voyage from Guadeloupe to New York City. Her fate remains a mystery.

See also
Indian Indenture Ships to Fiji

References

Indian indentureship in Trinidad and Tobago
Indian indenture ships to Fiji
Individual sailing vessels
Missing ships
Victorian-era passenger ships of the United Kingdom
1890 ships
Maritime incidents in 1892
Ships lost with all hands
Shipwrecks in the Atlantic Ocean